Telefuturo, sometimes known as Canal 4, is a Paraguayan television network. The station operates between 66 and 72 MHz in Asunción, and reaches almost the entire population of Paraguay. Telefuturo's coverage reaches almost all the Región Oriental, where approximately 97% of the population of Paraguay lives. Since its inception it maintained a steady growth and currently has 14 repeaters.

Programming

News 
 Día a Día
 Meridiano Informativo
 Telediario
 La Lupa
 AAM

Sports 
 Telefútbol 
 Coche a la Vista 
 El Deportivo 
 Fútbol a lo Grande TV

Variety 
 Vive la Vida
 Vive la Tarde

Entertainment 
 Baila Conmigo Paraguay 
 El Conejo 
 MasterChef Paraguay
 Polémica en el Bar Paraguay
 Telembopi
 Yo me Llamo

Upcoming programs 
 La Voz... Paraguay (reality show)
 Got Talent Paraguay (reality show)

References

External links 

  Official site

Television channels and stations established in 1967
Television stations in Paraguay
Spanish-language television stations
1967 establishments in Paraguay